Jhonder Leonel Cádiz Fernández (born 29 July 1995) is a Venezuelan professional footballer who plays as a striker for Primeira Liga club Famalicão and the Venezuela national team.

Club career
A product of Deportivo Petare's youth system, Cádiz made his professional debut in Deportivo Petare's 0–0 Primera División draw against Atlético El Vigía on 29 March 2012. He spent two seasons playing for Caracas FC.

Cádiz was loaned to Portuguese club C.F. União on 3 July 2015. A year later, he moved to fellow Madeira club C.D. Nacional, signing a three-year deal. On 28 June 2019, Portuguese champions Benfica announced that Cádiz had signed a five-year contract with the club. He was then loaned out to Dijon for one season. On 8 September, Cádiz joined MLS side Nashville SC on loan until 30 June 2021. On 29 June 2021 his contract for the U.S. club has been extended. Following the 2021 season Cádiz's purchase option was declined by Nashville and he returned to Benfica.

International career
On 23 May 2013, Cádiz was called up to the senior Venezuela national football team for a friendly match against El Salvador, but he did not play.

Career statistics

Club

References

External links
 

1995 births
Living people
Footballers from Caracas
Venezuelan footballers
Association football forwards
Deportivo Miranda F.C. players
Caracas FC players
C.F. União players
C.D. Nacional players
Moreirense F.C. players
S.L. Benfica footballers
Dijon FCO players
Nashville SC players
F.C. Famalicão players
Venezuelan Primera División players
Primeira Liga players
Ligue 1 players
Major League Soccer players
Designated Players (MLS)
Venezuela youth international footballers
Venezuela under-20 international footballers
Venezuela international footballers
2021 Copa América players
Venezuelan expatriate footballers
Venezuelan expatriate sportspeople in Portugal
Venezuelan expatriate sportspeople in France
Venezuelan expatriate sportspeople in the United States
Expatriate footballers in Portugal
Expatriate footballers in France
Expatriate soccer players in the United States